William Swan Plumer (July 26, 1802 – October 22, 1880) was an American clergyman, theologian and author who was recognized as an intellectual leader of the Presbyterian Church in the 1800s.

Early life
William S. Plumer was born to William and Catharine Plumer (née McAlester) in Greersburg, present day Darlington, Pennsylvania, on July 26, 1802.   He graduated from Washington College (now Washington and Lee University in Virginia) in 1825, received his religious education at Princeton Theological Seminary in New Jersey, and was ordained in the Presbyterian Church.  He was licensed in the Presbytery of New Brunswick, a Presbytery in New Jersey, as a clergyman in 1826, and the state's Orange Presbytery ordained him as an evangelist in 1827.

Career as clergyman
Plumer was the minister of several churches during his career, most notably: First Presbyterian Church, Richmond, Virginia (1834–1846); Franklin Street Presbyterian Church, Baltimore, Maryland (1847–1854); Central Presbyterian Church, Allegheny, Pennsylvania (1854–1862); Arch Street Presbyterian Church, Philadelphia, Pennsylvania (1862–1865); and Second Presbyterian Church, Pottsville, Pennsylvania (1865–1867).

From 1837 to 1845 Plumer was the editor of The Watchman of the South, a weekly Presbyterian newspaper which he had founded while serving as pastor in Richmond.  He was also a founder of Staunton's Institution for the Blind, Deaf, & Dumb.

Plumer moderated the General Assemblies of two different sects of American Presbyterianism, one in the Presbyterian Church of the United States of America in 1838 and in the Presbyterian Church in the United States in 1871. In both institutions he was a staunch supporter of Old School Presbyterianism.

Career as educator

In addition to his career in the pulpit, Plumer was a highly regarded religious instructor, and his teaching positions included: Professor at Pittsburgh Theological Seminary in Pennsylvania (1854–1862); Professor of Didactic and Polemic Theology (1867–1875) at Columbia Theological Seminary in South Carolina; and Professor of Pastoral, Casuistic, and Historical Theology (1875–1880) at Columbia.

Career as author
Plumer authored at least 25 books, including commentaries on Romans, Hebrews, and Psalms, as well as numerous tracts and pamphlets, and magazine and newspaper articles.  Many of his articles were published anonymously, so the number of writings he produced cannot be calculated with accuracy.

Death and burial
Plumer died in Baltimore on October 22, 1880, due to complications which arose after having surgery to remove kidney stones.  He was buried at Hollywood Cemetery in Richmond.

Family
In 1829 Plumer married a widow, Eliza Garden Hassell, in Hillsboro, North Carolina.  She died in 1878 and is also buried at Hollywood Cemetery.

Honors
Plumer was the recipient of several honorary degrees, including: three Doctors of Divinity (D.D.) (Washington & Lee, Lafayette College, and Washington & Jefferson College); and one LL.D. (University of Mississippi).

Written works
(Partial list of works known to be, or presumed to be, authored by William Swan Plumer)

 How to Bring Up Children, 1822
 Scripture Doctrine of a Call to the Work of the Gospel Ministry, 1832
 Am I Self-Deceived?, 1840
 The Bible True, and Infidelity Wicked, 1840
  The Substance of an Argument Against the Indiscriminate Incorporation of Churches and Religious Societies, 1847
 Thoughts on the Religious Instruction of the Negroes of This Country, 3 editions - first published in 1848
 Young Children May Be Truly Pious, 1850
 The Grace of Christ, 3 editions - first published in 1853
 Rome Against the Bible, 1854
 The Law of God, 1864
 Vital Godliness, 5 editions - first published in 1864
 Psalms, 1867
 Studies in the Book of Psalms, 3 editions - first published in 1867
 The Rock of Our Salvation, 3 editions - first published in 1867
 Words of Truth and Love, 1867
 Jehovah-Jireh, 2 editions - first published in 1867
 Earnest Hours, 1869
 Commentary on Paul's Epistle to the Romans, 4 editions - first published in 1870
 The Promises of God, 1872
 Commentary on the Epistle of Paul, the Apostle, to the Hebrews, 2 editions - first published in 1872
 Hints and Helps in Pastoral Theology, 3 editions - first published in 1874
 Truths for the People, 1875

References

External links
William Swan Plumer at Reformed Forum.  Barry Waugh, December 6, 2013.
William Swan Plumer in The South in History and Literature.  By Mildred Lewis Rutherford.  1906.  Page 805.
William Swan Plumer in A House Dividing Against Itself, 1836-1840.  By William Lloyd Garrison.  1971.  Page 264.
William Swan Plumer Biography and works available at Log College Press
 

1802 births
1880 deaths
People from Greensburg, Pennsylvania
Washington and Lee University alumni
Princeton Theological Seminary alumni
19th-century American newspaper publishers (people)
19th-century American newspaper founders
19th-century Presbyterian ministers
19th-century American writers
Burials at Hollywood Cemetery (Richmond, Virginia)
Pittsburgh Theological Seminary faculty